A Close Call is a 1929 animated short film which is part of the early sound cartoon series entitled Aesop's Sound Fables. It was produced by The Van Beuren Corporation and released by Pathé.

Copyrighted on December 1, 1929, The film, like other Aesop Sound Fables at that time, featured Milton and Rita as the main characters. However, although it is part of the Aesop series, it is not based on an Aesop fable.

Plot 

The film begins with a mouse playing tulips in a bell-like fashion. Milton and Rita are seen dancing together. A cat, who is driving a car, sees Rita, and when Milton is not looking, kidnaps Rita. Milton, who then noticed Rita's disappearance, starts to chase after the car. The cat then takes Rita to a barn. The cat, then tries to offer Rita some pearls. He is unsuccessful, as Rita throws the pearls at his mouth, causing him to swallow them. Rita, then tries to outrun the cat, shielding herself in another room. Milton, then arrives at his barn and kicks down the doors. He then sees Rita and climb up the stair to try to get her out of the barn. He is unsuccessful, as the cat kicks him down the stairs. The cat then tries him up to a log, and then starts up a saw, with the intention of sawing him in half. The police then notice the noise, and with chivalry, start to descend onto the house. They circle the house and begin to starting shooting at the house. The cat is killed in the police ambush, after a shoot hits him, freeing Rita. Milton is saved by the police officer, who shuts off the saw. They both regroup and agree to get married.  During the wedding, the pastor sneezes into the book. So the pastor then ties Milton and Rita's tails in two, which is a pun on tying the knot. The choir who were singing hymns before, then descend to "You're in the Army Now!". Milton and Rita then kiss.

It then cuts to an scene, which states that "2600 Years Ago Aesop Said, All's Well That Ends Well", which is incorrect, as Aesop was not born 2600 years ago, and that the term "All's Well That Ends Well" is said by William Shakespeare, not Aesop.

Reception 
A Close Call was well received by the cinema magazines at that time. The Motion Picture News stated that the cartoon was "Right up to standard, and even a little higher than average" and also stating that it "furnishes plenty of laughs for the light spot on your bill". Whilst The Film Daily said that the film was a "Fine Animated Film", and also said that the film "succeeded in creating considerable suspense".

Milton and Rita
Like many other Sound Fables, Milton and Rita are featured as the main characters in this cartoon. They are featured in a more simple mouse-like fashion, than the more complicated human-like fashion in cartoons like Circus Capers.

References

External links 
 
 

1929 films
1920s American animated films
1929 animated films
American black-and-white films